Lindon Selahi (born 26 February 1999) is a professional footballer who plays as a midfielder for HNK Rijeka. Born in Belgium, he represents the Albania national team.

Early life
Selahi was born in Namur, Belgium to an Albanian family from North Macedonia. He started playing football at the age of 4 with local clubs.

Club career

Youth career
Selahi started his football career in local clubs, he joined UR Namur which played in the second division at this time, he regularly played with older boys and was captain of his teams. He was noticed by Standard Liège staff and joined the club in 2011. He left the Walloon club to join RSC Anderlecht, then he joined Standard Liège again in 2016. During his youth career at Standard Liège and Anderlecht, Selahi has played with many players of the talented 99-born generation, many of them became professional football players in and outside Belgium.

Standard Liège
In June 2016, Selahi signed his first professional contract with Standard Liège. Selahi made his professional debut for Standard Liège in a 3-1 Belgian First Division A win over Anderlecht on 10 May 2018.

Twente
On 6 June 2019, Selahi signed a two-year contract with an option of further one with the Dutch club FC Twente. He made his official debut in a league game against PSV Eindhoven and scored his first Eredivisie goal on 25 October 2019 against FC Emmen.

Loan to Willem II Tilburg 
On January 15, 2021, Selahi moved to Dutch club Willem II Tilburg, on loan until the end of the season.

HNK Rijeka
On July 24, 2021, Selahi signed a 3 years contract for HNK Rijeka, he arrived as a free agent.

International career
Lindon Selahi was born in Belgium, his family is of Albanian descent from North Macedonia, his grandparents left Kumanovo in the late 1950s then moved to Belgium in the 1960s. Selahi's family still lives in Belgium today but is attached to the Albanian homeland, all of them speak perfect Albanian.  
Selahi was a youth international footballer for Belgium. He had the choice between several national teams: Kosovo, Albania, Belgium and North Macedonia but he chose to represent Albania and obtained an Albanian passport in 2018. Selahi also represented the Albania U17s in a pair of friendly tournaments in 2015.

He made his debut with the Albanian U21 national team against Bosnia. In October 2019 he was called by the senior Albania national football team. He made his debut on 14 October 2019 in a Euro 2020 qualifier against Moldova. He substituted Keidi Bare in the 89th minute.

Career statistics

Club

Last update: January, 2023

International

Honours
Standard Liège
 Belgian Cup: 2017–18

References

External links
 Soccerway Profile
 
 Fox Sports Profile
 Standard Profile
 Career stats - Voetbal International

1999 births
Living people
Sportspeople from Namur (city)
Albanian footballers from North Macedonia
Belgian people of Albanian descent
Belgian people of Macedonian descent
Association football midfielders
Albanian footballers
Albania youth international footballers
Albania international footballers
Belgian footballers
Belgium youth international footballers
Standard Liège players
FC Twente players
Willem II (football club) players
HNK Rijeka players
Belgian Pro League players
Eredivisie players
Albanian expatriate footballers
Expatriate footballers in the Netherlands
Albanian expatriate sportspeople in the Netherlands
Footballers from Namur (province)